Richard Shelton may refer to:
 Richard Shelton (actor), English actor and singer
 Richard Shelton (writer) (1933–2022), American writer, poet and professor of English
 Richard Shelton (American football) (born 1966), American football player 
 Richard Shelton (solicitor general) (died 1647), English lawyer and politician